Alexandra Diana Badea (born 22 May 1998) is a Romanian handballer who plays as a right wing for Rapid București.

Achievements  
Liga Națională:
Winner: 2019, 2022 
Cupa României:
Finalist: 2018, 2019 
Supercupa României:
Winner: 2018

References
  

1998 births
Living people
Sportspeople from Bucharest
Romanian female handball players 
SCM Râmnicu Vâlcea (handball) players